Mahoning Creek is a tributary of the Allegheny River in Pennsylvania in the United States.

Course
Portions of the Mahoning Creek watershed fall in Armstrong, Jefferson, and Indiana counties. The headwaters of Mahoning Creek are the East Branch Mahoning Creek and Stump Creek in Clearfield County. Mahoning Creek flows west through Pennsylvania and joins the Allegheny River just upstream of Templeton.

The creek can be divided into three sections:
 Upper Mahoning Creek, from the headwaters to Mahoning Creek Lake
 Mahoning Creek Lake, formed by Mahoning Creek Dam
 (Lower) Mahoning Creek, from the dam to the Allegheny River

The waterway is a popular destination for fly fishermen.

Tributaries

East Branch Mahoning Creek

Little Mahoning Creek

Pine Run

Political subdivisions
Mahoning Creek traverses the following political subdivisions, listed in order of encounter traveling downstream,

Henderson Township, Jefferson County
Big Run
Bell Township, Jefferson County
Punxsutawney
Perry Township, Jefferson County
West Mahoning Township, Indiana County
Wayne Township, Armstrong County
Redbank Township, Armstrong County
Mahoning Township, Armstrong County
Pine Township, Armstrong County

East Branch Mahoning Creek traverses the following political subdivisions, listed in order of encounter traveling downstream.

Brady Township, Clearfield County
Henderson Township, Jefferson County
Gaskill Township, Jefferson County

Little Mahoning Creek traverses the following political subdivisions, listed in order of encounter traveling downstream.

Green Township, Indiana County
Grant Township, Indiana County
Canoe Township, Indiana County
East Mahoning Township, Indiana County
North Mahoning Township, Indiana County
South Mahoning Township, Indiana County
West Mahoning Township, Indiana County

Pine Run traverses the following political subdivisions, listed in order of encounter traveling downstream,

Perry Township, Jefferson County
Ringgold Township, Jefferson County
Timblin
Redbank Township, Armstrong County

See also
 Tributaries of the Allegheny River
 List of rivers of Pennsylvania
 List of tributaries of the Allegheny River

References

Pennsylvania Department of Conservation and Natural Resources: Mahoning Creek Watershed

External links

U.S. Geological Survey: PA stream gaging stations
U.S. Army Corps of Engineers: Mahoning Creek Lake

Rivers of Pennsylvania
Tributaries of the Allegheny River
Rivers of Armstrong County, Pennsylvania
Rivers of Indiana County, Pennsylvania
Rivers of Jefferson County, Pennsylvania